Tom Hart is a television announcer for ESPN. He attended Rock Bridge High School in Columbia, Missouri and is a graduate of the University of Missouri. Hart lives in Atlanta.

Biography
Hart is a former field reporter on Braves Live, a pregame/postgame show for the Atlanta Braves. He calls college football and basketball for the ESPN family of networks after having performed the same role for the Big Ten Network from 2010–2012. Hart has also been the insider for college football and basketball on Fox Sports Radio and has been the play-by-play commentator and studio host for Comcast Sports Southeast. He also has served as a broadcaster for two minor league baseball teams: the Winston-Salem Warthogs and the Tennessee Smokies, where he also served as director of media relations.

Career timeline
1999-2002 ISP Sports Network studio host
1999-2002 Winston-Salem Warthogs play-by-play
2002-2006 Tennessee Smokies play-by-play, director of media relations (where he was twice named Southern League Broadcaster of the Year)
2003-2011 Comcast Sports Southeast studio anchor, play-by-play for college football, basketball, and Southern League baseball
2004-2010 College Sports Television/CBS College Sports Network college football and basketball play-by-play
2008-2010 Fox Sports Radio college football and basketball insider
2010-2012 Big Ten Network college football and basketball play-by-play
2011-2014 Braves Live host, field reporter
2012-2014 ESPN College Football and College Basketball on ESPN play-by-play
2014–present SEC Network college football, basketball, and baseball play-by-play
2020–present MLB on ESPN play-by-play

References

General

Notes

Living people
People from Columbia, Missouri
Rock Bridge High School alumni
University of Missouri alumni
American television sports announcers
American radio sports announcers
College football announcers
College basketball announcers in the United States
Georgia Tech Yellow Jackets football announcers
National Basketball Association broadcasters
Major League Baseball broadcasters
National Football League announcers
Atlanta Braves announcers
Women's college basketball announcers in the United States
XFL (2020) broadcasters
Year of birth missing (living people)